Kõlunõmme is a village in Hiiumaa Parish, Hiiu County in northwestern Estonia. According to the 2011 Estonia Census, it has a population of 33, with 32 Estonians.

Gallery

References

Villages in Hiiu County